Storm Rider Clash of the Evils is a Chinese animated feature film directed by Dante Lam and produced by Puzzle Animation Studio Limited and Shanghai Media Group. It is based on the manhua series Fung Wan by Ma Wing-shing.

Plot
The film is a spinoff of the original story and the two protagonists Wind and Cloud. The residents of Sword-Worshipping Manor, which houses the best sword-smiths in the world, are brutally massacred after they are alleged to be plotting a rebellion against the government. The young master of the manor, Ngou Kuet, is the only survivor. Ngou Kuet vows to finish forging the "Kuet" Sword, a task passed down by generations of his family which has yet to be completed. Ngou Kuet attacks Tin Ha Wui and battles with Wind and Cloud to obtain the blood of the Fire Kirin which can unleash the power of the sword. As the blood of the Fire Kirin runs in Wind's veins, he becomes Ngou Kuet's primary target.

Voice cast

Production
The first trailer for the film was released in 2006. It showed a battle between Cloud and Wind in a forest. They eventually show their true powers and escalate the fight to greater heights. They are then shown clashing on top of the Great Wall of China. Characters that are so far confirmed to be in this movie are Cloud, Wind, Duen Long, the Fire Kirin, Hung Ba, Nameless, Second Dream, Frost, Charity and Ngou Kuet.

The film was supposed to be released in the winter of 2006 but its release was delayed to July 2008.

Reception
The film grossed  in China.

See also

The Storm Riders
The Storm Warriors
Wind and Cloud
Wind and Cloud 2

References

External links
 
 

Hong Kong animated films
Wuxia films
Fung Wan
2000s Mandarin-language films
Cantonese-language films
Films directed by Dante Lam
2008 animated films
Films based on Hong Kong comics
Animated films based on comics
Adaptations of works by Ma Wing-shing
2008 films
Chinese animated films
2000s Hong Kong films